Lafayette Theatre may refer to:
 Lafayette Theatre (Suffern), in Suffern, Rockland County, New York, United States
 Lafayette Theatre (Harlem), in Harlem, Manhattan, New York City, New York, United States
Lafayette Circus (Manhattan), Manhattan, New York City, New York, United States, built in 1825, destroyed by fire in 1829